"Revolution Radio" is a song by American rock band Green Day. It was released on May 16, 2017, as the third and final single from their twelfth studio album of the same name. The song's music video, filmed at 924 Gilman Street, was released on June 12, 2017.

Chart performance
"Revolution Radio" appeared on the charts back in 2016 after the release of the lyric video, charting at number 22 on the US Hot Rock Songs, number 6 on the UK Rock chart and number 71 in Scotland. Since its single release, it has charted at number 9 on the US Mainstream Rock chart, number 21 on the US Alternative Songs chart, number 22 on the US Rock Airplay chart and number 11 on the Canada rock chart.

Charts

References

2016 songs
2017 singles
Green Day songs
Reprise Records singles
Songs written by Billie Joe Armstrong
Songs written by Mike Dirnt
Songs written by Tré Cool